The women's 200 metres event at the 2005 Asian Athletics Championships was held in Incheon, South Korea on September 3–4.

Medalists

Results

Heats
Wind: Heat 1: 0.0 m/s, Heat 2: +0.5 m/s

Final
Wind: +0.9 m/s

References
Results

2005 Asian Athletics Championships
200 metres at the Asian Athletics Championships
2005 in women's athletics